Cole Hammer (born August 28, 1999) is an American professional golfer.

College career
Hammer competed for the Texas Longhorns and was Big 12 Conference champion in 2021.

Amateur career
Hammer has competed in three U.S. Opens and two Walker Cups.

In 2018, he won the U.S. Amateur Four-Ball, partnering with Garrett Barber.

Additionally, in 2019 he won the Mark H. McCormack Medal as the best amateur golfer in the world.

In 2022, Hammer ended his college and amateur career was part of the winning team at the 2022 NCAA Division I Championship.

Professional career
Hammer turned professional in June 2022 after the NCAA Championship and made his professional debut at the Wichita Open on the Korn Ferry Tour. He has status on the tour for the remainder of 2022.

Amateur wins
2018 Azalea Invitational, Western Amateur
2019 Southern Highlands Collegiate, Lamkin Grips SD Classic, NCAA Austin Regional
2020 South Beach International Amateur
2021 Big 12 Men's Championship

Source:

Results in major championships
Results not in chronological order in 2020.

CUT = missed the halfway cut
NT = No tournament due to COVID-19 pandemic

U.S. national team appearances
Amateur
Junior Presidents Cup: 2017 (winners)
Eisenhower Trophy: 2018
Arnold Palmer Cup: 2019
Walker Cup: 2019 (winners), 2021 (winners)

Source:

References

External links

American male golfers
Texas Longhorns men's golfers
Golfers from Houston
1999 births
Living people